Thea Kay Slatyer (born 2 February 1983) is an Olympian, and former member of the Australia Women's National Football Team, The Matildas. She was an intimidating, no-nonsense defender similar to Manchester United's Vidic. Slatyer was a tough tackler and very strong in the air. Thea last played for Melbourne Victory in the Australian W-League in 2016.

Playing career

Club career
Slatyer played for Washington Freedom(2006), Canberra United(2009), Newcastle Jets(2011) and Sydney FC(2012) in the Australian W-League before retiring in 2012.

In 2015 Slatyer came out of retirement to join Melbourne Victory, reuniting with former teammate and captain Melissa Barbieri.

International career
After making her debut for Australia in 2002 in Vancouver, Canada, Slatyer earned a total of 51 caps playing for the Matildas, scoring three times. Slatyer debuted as a young Matilda in 2002, and represented Australia in the inaugural FIFA U19 World cup in Canada. After making selection in the 2003 World Cup team, Slatyer tore her ACL in a pre World Cup tour in Sendai Japan, ending World Cup participation. Slatyer returned to the Matildas and was selected in the 20-player 2004 Australian Olympic Team, competing in Athens.

In June 2011, Slatyer was on the cover of the Australian FourFourTwo Magazine along with fellow Matilda's Melissa Barbieri, Sam Kerr, Kyah Simon and Sarah Walsh.

Working life
Thea is a NSW volunteer fire fighter, and previously worked as a sound engineer and DJ around Sydney. She continued her career as a mounted security patrol for the ATC, a bodyguard and security detail for various celebrities/prominent figures, and is a black belt in martial arts.

Thea currently works as an integrity inspection engineer in the marine, aerospace and energy sectors.

International goals

Honours

 With Australia
 AFC Women's Asian Cup Winners: 2010
 2009 Inaugural W League Tournament finalist
 2007 FIFA World Cup Finalists, China
 AFC Women's Asian Cup runner up: 2006
 2004 Australian Olympic Team, Athens, Greece 
 2003 FIFA World Cup Team Selection 
 2002 Inaugural U19 FIFA World Cup Tournament finalist
 Australian Institute of Sport
 NSW Institute of Sport

References

External links 
 Interview with Four Four Two magazine

1983 births
Living people
Australian women's soccer players
Washington Freedom players
Canberra United FC players
Newcastle Jets FC (A-League Women) players
Sydney FC (A-League Women) players
Melbourne Victory FC (A-League Women) players
A-League Women players
Olympic soccer players of Australia
Footballers at the 2004 Summer Olympics
2007 FIFA Women's World Cup players
Australia women's international soccer players
Women's association football defenders
Soccer players from Sydney
Sportswomen from New South Wales
Australian expatriate sportspeople in the United States
Expatriate women's soccer players in the United States
Australian expatriate women's soccer players